John Kenneth Gibson Oswald (born 6 June 1939) is a former Australian politician. He was a Liberal Party member of the South Australian House of Assembly between 1979 and 2002, representing the safe Liberal electorate of Morphett.

Previous to Oswald's involvement in state politics, he was a member of Rotary and numerous electorate, sporting and other clubs, as well as a registered pharmacist through the University of Adelaide.

From 1993 to 1995, Oswald was Minister for Housing, Urban Development and Local Government Relations, Minister for Recreation, and Sport and Racing. From 1997 to 2002, he was the Speaker of the South Australian House of Assembly for the John Olsen and Rob Kerin Liberal governments.

Oswald retired in 2002.

References

 

1939 births
Living people
Liberal Party of Australia members of the Parliament of South Australia
Members of the South Australian House of Assembly
Speakers of the South Australian House of Assembly
21st-century Australian politicians